Fernando Soto-Hay y Garcia served as a member of the National Court of Honor of the Asociación de Scouts de México, Asociación Civil, as well as the Chairman of the Interamerican Scout Training Commission.

In 1995, he was awarded the 244th Bronze Wolf, the only distinction of the World Organization of the Scout Movement, awarded by the World Scout Committee for exceptional services to world Scouting.

References

External links

Recipients of the Bronze Wolf Award
Year of birth missing
Possibly living people
Scouting and Guiding in Mexico